Wheelabrator may refer to:
Wheelabrator Technologies, a subsidiary of Waste Management, Inc.
Wheelabrator Incinerator, a waste-to-energy plant in Baltimore, Maryland, probably best recognized by its tall white smokestack on nearby Interstate 95